Damodar K. Mavalankar (born September 1857 in Ahmedabad - departed for the Himalayas 1885) was an Indian Theosophist.

Biography
He was born in the family of the Karhâda Mahârashtra caste of Brâhmanas, a wealthy Indian family. Apart from learning the tenets of his religion by his father from an early age, he also received a very good English education.

In 1879 he met Henry Steel Olcott and H. P. Blavatsky in Bombay, after they had just established the Theosophical Society's temporary Indian headquarters there. Damodar joined the Society in 1879, giving up his caste, and in 1880, he officially became a Buddhist while in Sri Lanka, along with Henry Steel Olcott and H. P. Blavatsky. His actions displeased his family and led to conflict, due to them desiring him to return home and live with his wife who was betrothen to him in his childhood, or face the consequences of being cut out of his will. In response to this, Damodar gave up an income of 50,000 Indian rupees to provide for the future of his wife, and continued to live and work with the Theosophical founders.

He continued his work in this way until 1885, when he went to Tibet.

References

External links

'Damodar K. Mavalankar' by Sri Raghavan Iyer
'Damodar, The Writings of a Hindu Chela', Compiled by Sven Eek
'Damodar, The Writings of a Hindu Chela', Compiled by Sven Eek -- Biographical notes

1857 births
1885 deaths
Year of death uncertain
Indian Theosophists
Writers from Ahmedabad
19th-century Indian non-fiction writers